Poręba is a village in the administrative district of Gmina Leśnica, within Strzelce County, Opole Voivodeship, in south-western Poland. 

History
Poręba was first mentioned 1485 as Poramba. The village belonged to Strela family throughout the 15th and 16th centuries, the founders of the first church on the St Anna Mountain (Góra Świętej Anny). Since 1637 the settlement belonged to Melchior Ferdynand Gaszyn. Between 1871 and 1945 it was part of Germany.

References

Villages in Strzelce County